BWC: British Wrestling Weekly is a weekly Professional Wrestling program that airs Saturday's on Fight Network & on local television stations in the UK.

References

2010s British sports television series